Han Pijesak is a town and municipality located in Republika Srpska, an entity of Bosnia and Herzegovina. As of 2013, it has a population of 3,530 inhabitants, while the town of Han Pijesak has a population of 2,018 inhabitants.

Settlements
Aside from the town of Han Pijesak, the municipality consists of the following settlements:

 Babine Gornje
 Berkovina
 Borovine 
 Brložnik
 Džimrije
 Gođenje
 Japaga
 Jelovci
 Kraljevo Polje
 Kram
 Krivače
 Kusače
 Malo Polje
 Mrkalji
 Nerići
 Nevačka
 Pjenovac
 Plane
 Podžeplje
 Potkozlovača
 Ravanjsko
 Rečica
 Rijeke
 Rubinići
 Stoborani 
 Žeravice

Demographics

Population

Ethnic composition

Economy
The following table gives a preview of total number of registered people employed in legal entities per their core activity (as of 2018):

See also
 Municipalities of Bosnia and Herzegovina

References

External links

 Official site

Populated places in Han Pijesak
Cities and towns in Republika Srpska
Glasinac plateau
Romanija plateau
Han Pijesak